Emil Gottlieb Heinrich Kraeling (1892–1973) was an American Lutheran biblical scholar and Aramaicist. He came from an extended German-American Lutheran family. Kraeling attended the Lutheran Seminary of Philadelphia from 1909 to 1912, and then was associate professor of Old Testament at Union Seminary. Among his best known works was a study of Job The Book of the Ways of God. In 1937 he published papers in agreement with Henri Frankfort identifying a woman in the Burney Relief as the Lilith of later Jewish mythology.

Selected works
 The Old Testament since the Reformation
 Our Living Bible co-authored with Michael Avi Yonah. Old Testament text by M. Avi-Yonah. New Testament text by Emil G. Kraeling. With illustrations.
 The Brooklyn Museum Aramaic Papyri: New Documents Of The Fifth Century B. C. From The Jewish Colony Of Elephantine
 The Prophets
 The Disciples
 I Have Kept the Faith; The Life of the Apostle Paul
 Aram and Israel: The Arameans in Syria and Mesopotamia (1918)
 The Four Gospels (Clarified New Testament) (1962)
 The Book of the Ways of God (1938)

Editor:
 Rand McNally Historical Atlas of the Holy Land

References

1892 births
1973 deaths
20th-century Christian biblical scholars
American biblical scholars
American Lutherans
Lutheran biblical scholars
Old Testament scholars
20th-century Lutherans